The following is a list of notable deaths in October 2006.

Entries for each day are listed alphabetically by surname. A typical entry lists information in the following sequence:
 Name, age, country of citizenship at birth, subsequent country of citizenship (if applicable), reason for notability, cause of death (if known), and reference.

October 2006

1
Frank Beyer, 74, German film director (Jacob the Liar).
Sir Laurence Brodie-Hall, 96, Australian mining executive.
Alan Caillou, 91, British actor and writer.
Pierre Gorman, 82, Australian librarian and academic. 
Jack Kirkbride, 83, British cartoonist, father of actress Anne Kirkbride.
Anna Kunkel, 74, American baseball player (AAGPBL).
Renato Polselli, 84, Italian film director (The Vampire and the Ballerina, Black Magic Rites).
Rafael Quintero, 66, Cuban-born American CIA agent.
André Viger, 54, Canadian wheelchair marathoner and paralympian, cancer.
Yoshihiro Yonezawa, 53, Japanese manga critic, lung cancer.

2
Marta Fernandez Miranda de Batista, 82, Cuban First Lady (1952–1959), second wife of President Fulgencio Batista.
Frances Bergen, 84, American actress, wife of ventriloquist Edgar Bergen and mother of actress Candice Bergen.
Helen Chenoweth-Hage, 68, American Republican Representative for Idaho (1995–2001), car accident.
Bhaktisvarupa Damodar Swami, 69, Indian scientist, spiritual teacher and poet, heart attack.
Tamara Dobson, 59, American actress (Cleopatra Jones), complications from pneumonia and multiple sclerosis.
Paul Halmos, 90, Hungarian-born American mathematician.
Paul Richardson, 74, American Phillies longtime organist, prostate cancer.
Clyde Vollmer, 85, American Major League Baseball player (Cincinnati Reds).

3
Lucilla Andrews, 86, British romantic novelist.
Sir John Cox, 77, British admiral who was Commander-in-Chief in the South Atlantic.
John Crank, 90, British mathematical physicist who helped solve the heat equation.
Gwen Meredith, 98, Australian writer of all 5795 episodes of the long-running radio serial Blue Hills, after heart trouble.
Peter Norman, 64, Australian athlete, silver medalist at the 1968 Summer Olympics, heart attack.

4
R. W. Apple, Jr., 71, American political journalist and food writer (The New York Times), thoracic cancer.
Tom Bell, 73, British actor (Wish You Were Here, Prime Suspect), after short illness.
Victor Dyrgall, 88, American Olympic runner.
František Fajtl, 94, Czech World War II fighter pilot, after long illness.
Norbert Franck, 88, Luxembourgian Olympic swimmer.
Walter Gibb, 87, British aviator and test pilot who twice held the world flight altitude record.
Ralph Griswold, 72, American creator of Snobol and Icon programming languages, cancer.
Vic Heyliger, 87, American ice hockey Hall of Fame player and coach.
Oskar Pastior, 78, Romanian-born German writer.
Riccardo Pazzaglia, 80, Italian actor, writer and film director.
Don Thompson, 73, British race walker and 1960 Olympic gold medal winner, aneurysm.
Katarina Tomasevski, 53, Croatian-born former United Nations Special Rapporteur on the Right to Education.

5
Valerie Campbell-Harding, 74, Canadian textile art designer, heart attack.
Friedrich Karl Flick, 79, German-Austrian billionaire industrialist.
George King, 78, American college basketball coach (West Virginia Mountaineers, Purdue Boilermakers).
Speedy O. Long, 78, American Democratic Representative for Louisiana (1964–1972), cousin of Huey Long.
Jennifer Moss, 61, British actress, played Lucille Hewitt on Coronation Street.
Antonio Peña, 53, Mexican promoter of Lucha Libre AAA World Wide, heart attack.
Jackie Rae, 84, Canadian singer, songwriter and entertainer.
Dick Wagner, 78, American former president of the Cincinnati Reds and Houston Astros, injuries from a 1999 car crash.
Gilbert F. White, 94, American geographer.

6
Bertha Brouwer, 75, Dutch athlete, silver medalist in the 200m at the 1952 Olympics.
Charles Clark, 73, British publisher and lawyer.
Claude Luter, 83, French jazz clarinetist and bandleader.
Eduardo Mignogna, 66, Argentinian film director.
Buck O'Neil, 94, American baseball player and manager in the Negro leagues, heart failure and bone marrow cancer.
Timo Sarpaneva, 79, Finnish glassmaker.
Heinz Sielmann, 89, German zoologist.
Wilson Tucker, 91, American science fiction writer.

7
Charlie Bradberry, 24, American NASCAR driver, car accident.
Danifel Campilan, 25, Filipino news reporter (24 Oras), car accident.
Polly Craus, 83, American Olympic fencer.
Craig Dobbin, 71, Canadian founder of CHC Helicopter, after illness following lung transplant.
Julen Goikoetxea, 21, Spanish bicycle racer, suicide by jumping.
Anna Politkovskaya, 48, Russian journalist, shot.
Peter H. Rossi, 84, American sociologist.

8
Bob Cunningham, 79, Canadian football player.
Ira B. Harkey Jr., 88, American newspaper editor, winner of the 1963 Pulitzer Prize for Editorial Writing.
Pavol Hnilica, 85, Slovak Catholic bishop.
Ivan Murrell, 63, American Major League Baseball player for the Astros and Padres.
Mark Porter, 32, New Zealand racing driver, race crash.

9
Sedat Alp, 93, Turkish archaeologist specializing in Hittitology.
Coccinelle, 75, French transsexual singer, stroke.
Reg Freeson, 80, British politician, Minister of State for Housing and Local Government (1974–1979).
Marek Grechuta, 60, Polish singer, composer and lyricist. (Polish)
Danièle Huillet, 70, French filmmaker, cancer.
Paul Hunter, 27, British snooker player, neuroendocrine tumours.
Mario Moya Palencia, 73, Mexican politician and diplomat (Interior Minister, 1969–1976), heart attack.
Glenn Myernick, 51, American assistant soccer coach of the men's national team, heart attack.
Raymond Noorda, 82, American computer executive, CEO of Novell (1982–1994).
Kanshi Ram, 72, Indian politician, heart attack.

10
Sheikh Akijuddin, 76–77, Bangladeshi entrepreneur.
Carlo Acutis,15, beautified catholic teenager 
Jerry Belson, 68, American Emmy-winning television comedy writer (Tracey Ullman, Dick Van Dyke), prostate cancer.
Francis Berry, 91, British poet and literary critic.
P. C. Devassia, 100, Indian Sanskrit scholar and poet, won 1980 Sahitya Akademi Award (Kristubhagavatam).
Sir Derek Pattinson, 76, British Secretary-General of the General Synod of the Church of England (1972–1990)
Michael John Rogers, 74, British ornithologist.
Ian Scott, 72, Canadian Attorney General of Ontario (1985–1990).
Ravindra Varma, 81, Indian politician.

11
Henry Caldera, 69, Sri Lankan singer, cancer.
Sir Victor Goodhew, 86, British politician, Conservative MP for St Albans (1959–1983).
Cory Lidle, 34, American baseball pitcher (New York Yankees), victim of the 2006 New York City plane crash.
Benito Martínez, 126?, Cuban claimant to the title of world's oldest person.
Sir Robert Megarry, 96, British judge and Vice-Chancellor of the Supreme Court (1982–1985).
Eddie Pellagrini, 88, American baseball player and coach (Boston College).
Jimmy Peters, Sr., 84, Canadian ice hockey player, Stanley Cup winner (Montreal Canadiens, Detroit Red Wings).
Raad Mutar Saleh, Iraqi Mandaean leader, shot.
Jacques Sternberg, 83, French science fiction and fantastique author, lung cancer.
John Turvey, 61, Canadian youth activist and Order of Canada recipient, mitochondrial myopathy.

12
Todd Bolender, 92, American dancer and choreographer, director of the Kansas City Ballet.
Johnny Callison, 67, American Major League Baseball player, three-time All-Star outfielder with the Phillies.
Samuel B. Casey, Jr., 78, American CEO of Pullman Company.
Hermann Eilts, 84, German-born American diplomat and US ambassador to Saudi Arabia (1965–1970).
Angelika Machinek, 49, German glider pilot, five times national champion and holder of nine world records, air crash.
Eugène Martin, 91, French racing driver.
Gerard Murphy, 57, Irish mathematician.
Gillo Pontecorvo, 86, Italian film director (The Battle of Algiers), heart failure.

13
Mason Andrews, 87, American physician who delivered America's first test tube baby, Mayor of Norfolk, Virginia (1992–1994).
Deborah Blumer, 64, American member of the Massachusetts General Court, heart attack.
Petra Cabot, 99, American designer, created the Skotch Kooler, natural causes.
Bob Lassiter, 61, American talk radio personality.
Dino Monduzzi, 84, Italian cardinal, Prefect of the Pontifical Household (1986–1998).
Hilda Terry, 92, American cartoonist, creator of comic strip Teena.
Sir Anthony Tippet, 78, British admiral.
Wang Guangmei, 85, Chinese wife of late Communist leader Liu Shaoqi.

14
Bernard Allen, 69, American member of the North Carolina General Assembly.
James Barr, 82, British Old Testament scholar.
Chun Wei Cheung, 34, Dutch rowing cox, silver medallist at the 2004 Summer Olympics, liver cancer.
Freddy Fender, 69, American singer ("Before the Next Teardrop Falls"), lung cancer.
Klaas Runia, 80, Dutch Reformed Church theologian.
Gerry Studds, 69, American first openly gay congressman, represented Massachusetts (1973–1997), pulmonary embolism.

15
Eddie Blay, 68, Ghanaian Olympic boxer.
Derek Bond, 86, British actor (Callan, Scott of the Antarctic).
William Bright, 78, American linguist and author, recorder of indigenous North American languages.
Michael Forrester, 89, British army general.
Robert Pfarr, 86, American Olympic cyclist.
George Stevens, 74, American politician and Baptist minister.
Michelle Urry, 66, Canadian cartoon editor for Playboy.
Varduhi Vardanyan, 30, Armenian singer, traffic collision.
Maurice F. Weisner, 88, American admiral.

16
Niall Andrews, 69, Irish politician, Fianna Fáil TD for Dublin South (1977–1987), MEP for Leinster (1984–2004), lung cancer.
Donna Cook, 78, American baseball player (AAGPBL)
Ross Davidson, 57, British former EastEnders actor, brain tumour.
Sid Davis, 90, American educational filmmaker, lung cancer.
Martin Flannery, 88, British politician, Labour MP for Sheffield Hillsborough (1974–1992).
Harold Gardner, 107, American World War I veteran, served one day prior to the armistice.
Tommy Johnson, 71, American musician known for his work on the Jaws theme, complications of cancer and kidney failure.
John V. Murra, 90, Ukrainian-born American anthropologist and Inca scholar.
Valentín Paniagua, 70, Peruvian president (2000–2001), complications from heart surgery.
Lister Sinclair, 85, Canadian playwright and broadcaster, pulmonary embolism.
Ernie Steele, 88, American football player (Philadelphia Eagles).
Ondina Valla, 90, Italian athlete, first Italian female 1936 Olympic champion (80m hurdles), natural causes.
Anatoly Voronin, 55, Russian business chief of ITAR TASS news agency, stabbed.

17
Daniel Emilfork, 82, French actor (The City of Lost Children).
Miriam Engelberg, 48, American graphic author (Cancer Made Me a Shallower Person), metastatic breast cancer.
Christopher Glenn, 68, American CBS News radio and television news anchor, liver cancer.
Megan Meier, 13, American cyberbullying victim, suicide by hanging.
Ursula Moray Williams, 95, British children's author.
Lieuwe Steiger, 82, Dutch goalkeeper for PSV Eindhoven (1942–1957, 1959) and The Netherlands (1953–1954).
Marcia Tucker, 66, American curator, founder of the New Museum of Contemporary Art.

18
Don R. Christensen, 90, American animator and cartoonist.
Marc Hodler, 87, Swiss president of the International Ski Federation (1951–1998), International Olympic Committee whistleblower, stroke.
Stanislovas Jančiukas, 68, Lithuanian fashion designer.
Mario Francesco Pompedda, 77, Italian cardinal, Prefect of the Apostolic Signatura (1999–2004), brain hemorrhage.
Anna Russell, 94, British-born Canadian comedian and classical music satirist.
Laurie Taitt, 72, British sprint hurdler.
Alvin M. Weinberg, 91, American Manhattan Project scientist and former director of Oak Ridge National Laboratory.

19
Ralph Harris, Baron Harris of High Cross, 81, British life peer, founder of the Institute of Economic Affairs, heart attack.
Michael Johnson, 29, American criminal, suicide prior to execution.
Phyllis Kirk, 79, American actress (House of Wax, The Thin Man), post cerebral aneurysm.
Srividya, 53, Indian actress, cancer.

20
Don Burroughs, 75, American football player (1955–1964), cancer.
Irene Galitzine, 90, Russian-born Italian fashion designer.
Maxi Herber, 86, German figure skater, gold medal winner at the 1936 Winter Olympics, Parkinson's disease.
Lawrence Kolb, 95, American psychiatrist, leader in community mental health movement.
Eric Newby, 86, British travel writer.
Jane Wyatt, 96, American actress (Father Knows Best, Star Trek), natural causes.

21
Peter Barkworth, 77, British actor, bronchopneumonia following a stroke.
Paul Biegel, 81, Dutch writer of children's literature.
Pye Chamberlayne, 68, American radio journalist, heart attack.
Daryl Duke, 77, Canadian film director (The Thorn Birds), pulmonary fibrosis.
Bryan Hipp, American guitarist (Diabolic, Cradle of Filth).
Howard Lawson, 92, British cricketer (Hampshire).
Bob Mann, 82, American football player (Detroit Lions).
Arthur Peacocke, 81, British scientist and theologian.
Milton Selzer, 87, American actor.
Paul Walters, 59, British BBC radio and TV producer.
Sandy West, 47, American drummer and vocalist (The Runaways), lung cancer.
Urien Wiliam, 76, British writer.

22
Choi Kyu-hah, 87, South Korean president (1979–1980).
Nelson de la Rosa, 38, Dominican actor, "World's Shortest Man" in the 1989 Guinness Book of Records.
Masayuki Fujio, 89, Japanese former minister of education.
Arthur Hill, 84, Canadian Tony Award-winning actor (Who's Afraid of Virginia Woolf?), Alzheimer's disease.
Mancs, 12, Hungarian rescue dog with the Miskolc Spider Special Rescue Team, pneumonia.
Richard Mayes, 83, British stage and television actor.
Michael Mayne, 77, British clergyman, Dean of Westminster Abbey (1986–1996), cancer of the jaw.

23
Leonid Hambro, 86, American concert pianist.
Jane Elizabeth Hodgson, 91, American doctor and abortion rights advocate.
Bruno Lauzi, 69, Italian singer and composer, Parkinson's disease. 
Lebo Mathosa, 29, South African singer, car accident.
Egon Piechaczek, 69, Polish football player and coach.
Todd Skinner, 48, American free climber, climbing accident.
Rein Strikwerda, 76, Dutch doctor and knee injury specialist.

24
Daisy, 13, German-born Yorkshire terrier companion of murdered German designer Rudolph Moshammer.
Jeffrey Lundgren, 56, American convicted murderer, executed by lethal injection.
Enolia McMillan, 102, American civil rights activist, first female president of the NAACP, heart failure.
Benjamin Meed, 88, Polish-born American president and co-founder of the American Gathering of Jewish Holocaust Survivors.
Jack Radtke, 93, American baseball player.
William Montgomery Watt, 97, British professor of Arabic and Islamic Studies at the University of Edinburgh.

25
Paul Ableman, 79, British playwright and novelist.
Richard Cleaver, 89, Australian politician, MHR for Swan (1955–1969).
Allerton Cushman, 99, American Olympic rower.
Kintaro Ohki, 77, South Korean wrestler, heart attack.
Danny Rolling, 52, American convicted murderer, executed by lethal injection.
Emilio Vedova, 87, Italian painter.

26
Gary Coull, 52, Canadian journalist, co-founder of CLSA, cancer.
Rogério Duprat, 74, Brazilian composer, cancer.
Tillman Franks, 86, American bassist, songwriter and country music manager, natural causes.
Ralph R. Harding, 77, American congressman from Idaho (1961–1965).
Pontus Hultén, 82, Swedish art collector and museum director.
John Kentish, 96, British operatic tenor.
Kojima Nobuo, 91, Japanese author, pneumonia.
Theodore Taylor, 85, American writer (The Cay), heart attack.

27
John Broadbent, 92, Australian Army officer and lawyer.
Jozsef Gregor, 66, Hungarian opera singer.
Thomas R. Jones, 93, American jurist and civil rights activist.
Ghulam Ishaq Khan, 91, Pakistani civil servant and bureaucrat, President of Pakistan (1988–1993), pneumonia.
Marlin McKeever, 66, American former football player, head injuries from a fall.
Joe Niekro, 61, American Major League Baseball pitcher, brain aneurysm.
Muhammad Qasim, 32, Pakistani field hockey goalkeeper, cancer.
Albrecht von Goertz, 92, German-born American car designer.
Bradley Roland Will, 36, American Indymedia reporter, shot whilst covering the 2006 Oaxaca protests.

28
Red Auerbach, 89, American coach of the Boston Celtics (1950–1966), heart attack.
Tina Aumont, 60, French actress, pulmonary embolism.
György Bence, 64, Hungarian philosopher.
Trevor Berbick, 51, Jamaican former heavyweight boxing champion, last boxer to face Muhammad Ali, homicide.
Brian Brolly, 70, British co-manager of Wings (1973–1978), managing director of RUG (1978–1988), co-founder of Classic FM, heart attack.
Henry Fok, 83, Hong Kong businessman, philanthropist and CCPPC official, lymphoma.
Richard Gilman, 83, American drama and literary critic, lung cancer.
Peter Gingold, 90, German anti-fascist.
Marijohn Wilkin, 86, American country songwriter, member of the Nashville Songwriters Hall of Fame, heart failure.

29
Nigel Kneale, 84, British scriptwriter (The Quatermass Experiment), stroke.
Muhammadu Maccido, 78, Nigerian Sultan of Sokoto, Muslim spiritual leader, aeroplane crash.
Silas Simmons, 111, American Negro league baseball player, oldest known professional baseball player.

30
Clifford Geertz, 80, American cultural anthropologist, complications following heart surgery.
Jens Christian Hauge, 91, Norwegian World War II resistance leader, first postwar defence minister, natural causes.
Junji Kinoshita, 92, Japanese playwright, pneumonia.
Ian Rilen, 58, Australian bass player (Rose Tattoo), bladder cancer.
Aud Schønemann, 83, Norwegian actress.
Mose Tolliver, 87, American folk artist, pneumonia.

31
Hank Berger, 55, American nightclub owner, asthma-related problems.
P. W. Botha, 90, South African politician, Prime Minister (1978–1984), State President (1984–1989), heart attack.
Nikki Catsouras, 18, American teenage car crash victim from Orange County, California whose accident photos were released onto internet, automobile accident.
Shane Drury, 27, American professional bull rider in the PRCA, Ewing's sarcoma.
William Franklyn, 81, British actor, prostate cancer.
Peter Fryer, 79, British journalist who reported on the Hungarian Revolution.
Michael James Genovese, 87, American alleged Mafia boss of Pittsburgh.
George B. Thomas, 92, American mathematician and author, natural causes.
Nicholas John Vine-Hall, 62, Australian genealogist, cancer.

References

2006-10
 10